Highland Springs may refer to:

Communities
Highland Springs, Lake County, California
Highland Springs, Riverside County, California
Highland Springs, a neighborhood of Kokomo, Indiana
Highland Springs, Kentucky
Highland Springs, Virginia
Kidapawan, nicknamed Highland Springs, in the province of Cotabato, Philippines

Other uses
Highland Springs (race horse), the 1990 winner of the Appleton Stakes
Highland Springs Elementary School, in Beaumont, California
Highland Springs High School in Henrico County, Virginia
Highland Springs Reservoir, a reservoir near Kelseyville, California
Highland Springs Surgical Center in Beaumont, California, a Seventh-day Adventist health facility

See also
Highland (disambiguation)
Highland Spring, a Scottish supplier of bottled water